is a passenger railway station located in the town of Misaki, Sennan District, Osaka Prefecture, Japan, operated by the private railway operator Nankai Electric Railway. It has the station number "NK41-1".

Lines

Layout
The station consists of a single side platform on an embankment. The station is unattended.

Adjacent stations

History
Fukechō Station opened on June 1, 1944.

Passenger statistics
In fiscal 2019, the station was used by an average of 488 passengers daily.

Surrounding area
Osaka Prefectural Road No. 752 Wakayama Hannan Line and Osaka Prefectural Road No. 65 Misaki Kada Line intersect in front of the station

See also
 List of railway stations in Japan

References

External links

  

Railway stations in Japan opened in 1948
Railway stations in Osaka Prefecture
Misaki, Osaka